Nicholas (III) Kőszegi (died early 1314) was a Hungarian lord in the early 14th century, who served as Master of the treasury in 1307 and from 1311 to 1314.

Family
Nicholas was born around 1285 into the powerful and wealthy Kőszegi family, as one of the two sons of Gregory. His younger brother was Andrew. His father was killed by a lightning strike in 1297, leaving the child Nicholas as the heir of his grandfather Ivan, who had established a province in Western Transdanubia independently of the royal power. Nicholas had no descendants.

Career
Nicholas first appeared in contemporary records in February 1307, when he was referred to as Master of the treasury in the court of Otto of Bavaria, one of the pretenders to the Hungarian throne, whose aspirations was supported by Ivan Kőszegi. Nicholas lost the dignity still in that year, as Otto was captured and imprisoned by Ladislaus Kán in the following months. Ivan Kőszegi died on 5 April 1308. Nicholas inherited his power and positions; he became hereditary ispán of Vas, Sopron, Zala – and possibly Moson and Győr – counties until his death. He owned various castles in the region, for instance Kőszeg, Borostyánkő (today Bernstein, Austria), Sárvár and Bikug (near Deutschkreutz), in addition to the Pannonhalma Archabbey.

Abandoning the political orientation of his grandfather, Nicholas participated in that Diet in Pest on 27 November 1308, where Otto's rival, Charles of Anjou was unanimously proclaimed king. His uncle, Henry also attended the assembly. In June 1309, Henry Kőszegi confirmed his oath of allegiance to Charles on behalf of himself, his grandnephew Nicholas and their familiares. Historian Attila Zsoldos argues Henry acted as paterfamilias in this capacity, but Nicholas represented the Ivan branch within the Kőszegi kinship. After Henry's death in 1310, Nicholas became head of the family. After Matthew Csák's open face turning against Charles, Nicholas was made Master of the treasury in the spring of 1311, sometimes in March or April. He held the position until his death.

On 23 January 1312, Nicholas Kőszegi confirmed his previously concluded alliance with the House of Habsburg in Fürstenfeld, beyond his own person, on behalf of his brother Andrew, his uncle Bishop Nicholas of Győr and the sons of the late Henry, John and Peter "the Duke". In accordance with the document, Nicholas had a meeting with Frederick I, Duke of Austria sometimes earlier in Wiener Neustadt. The document emphasizes that Nicholas and his family were equally committed to serving Charles I too, simultaneously maintaining a good relationship with Frederick the Fair. Nicholas Kőszegi tried to stabilize his power in the borderlands and took a neutral position in Charles' unification war against the provincial lords; he did not send soldiers to the royal army, but did not rebel against the king, when Charles waged war with the powerful oligarch Matthew Csák in the early 1310s. Nicholas died in early 1314, leaving no male descendants. He was succeeded by Andrew, who renewed their grandfather's violent behavior and raids against the royal power, causing the family's downfall in 1317.

In hagiography
The circumstances of Nicholas' death appears in the 15th-century legend of Blessed Maurice Csák, although with many false data and interpretation. Accordingly, Maurice, who related to the Kőszegis from his maternal side, wished to recover his previously abandoned goods in order to donate them to the Virgin Mary monastery, located on an island of the Danube, but "king" Nicholas ["son of George"] refused his request after their conversation [in the autumn of 1313]. In response, Maurice prophesied that Nicholas will die within half a year because of his "harshness". For the specified time, Nicholas fell ill and called "his sons" [sic!], Bishop Nicholas of Győr and Andrew, and ordered them to hand over the goods for the monastery, according to Maurice's request, who predicted his death and thus "he has a holy and prophetic soul".

References

Sources 

 
 
 
 
 
 

1280s births
1314 deaths
Masters of the treasury (Kingdom of Hungary)
Nicholas 03
13th-century Hungarian people
14th-century Hungarian people